Virginia's 64th House of Delegates district elects one of 100 seats in the Virginia House of Delegates, the lower house of the state's bicameral legislature. District 64, located in Isle of Wight County, Prince George County, Suffolk, Surry County, was represented by Republican Rick Morris from 2012 to 2018. Due to scandal, Morris did not seek re-election in Virginia's November 2017 elections. Based on the results of the election, the seat has been held by Republican Emily Brewer since January 2018. Emily Brewer was challenged by Democrat Michele Joyce for Virginia House District 64. Elections will be held on Tuesday, November 5, 2019.

References

External links
 

Virginia House of Delegates districts
Isle of Wight County, Virginia
Prince George County, Virginia
Surry County, Virginia
Suffolk, Virginia